Natalie Bieser (born 1948) is an American artist.

Her work is included in the collections of the Virginia Museum of Fine Arts and the Whitney Museum of American Art.

References

External links
Official website

1948 births
20th-century American women artists
21st-century American women artists
Living people